Feast is a 2021 Dutch drama film directed by Tim Leyendekker. The film is based on a real-life crime case that happened in the Dutch city of Groningen in 2007, Where at a party multiple unconscious gay men were injected with the HIV-virus. It premiered at the International Film Festival Rotterdam.

Awards and nominations

References

External links 
 

2021 drama films
2021 films
2021 LGBT-related films
Dutch drama films
Dutch LGBT-related films
2020s Dutch-language films
HIV/AIDS in film